Iván Szelényi (born April 17, 1938 in Budapest) is a noted Hungarian-American sociologist, as of 2010 the Dean of Social Sciences at New York University Abu Dhabi.

Biography 

He is the son of Gusztáv Szelényi, an entomologist and Julianna Csapó. 

Szelényi studied at the External Trade Faculty of the Karl Marx University of Economics in Budapest, where he graduated in 1960. After graduating, he was employed at the Hungarian Central Statistical Office. He received a Ford Scholarship and studied at the University of California in Berkeley for one year. After his return he was a research fellow at the Institute of Sociology at the Hungarian Academy of Sciences (HAS). In 1967, he was elevated as scientific secretary and in 1970 as the Head of the Department of Regional Sociology. In 1973, he earned the title Candidate of Sciences (PhD) at the HAS. In 1974, a transcript of a book which he wrote with fellow sociologist and author György Konrád, titled The Intellectuals on the Road to Class Power, was brought out of Hungary. The book contained critical thought about Communist-ruled society. After this move, Szelényi was arrested, later expelled from Hungary and stripped of his citizenship.

In 1975, he was a Visiting Research Professor at the University of Kent. One year later he was invited to Flinders University of South Australia where he was the Foundation Professor of Sociology and Chair of the Department until 1980. In 1981, he joined the University of Wisconsin–Madison, where he was Professor of Sociology for five years (the last year as the Karl Polanyi Professor). After that he was appointed Distinguished Professor of Sociology, Director of the Center for Social Research and Executive Officer of the Sociology Program at the Graduate School of the City University of New York. 

From 1988 to 1999 he worked as Professor of Sociology at UCLA (between 1992 and 1995 as department chair). In 1999, he was appointed William Graham Sumner Professor of Sociology and Professor of Political Science at the Yale University. He chaired the department two times (1999–2002 and 2008–2009). In 2010, he became the Dean of Social Sciences at New York University Abu Dhabi, where he continues to teach today.

After the political change in Hungary, his citizenship was reinstated. Since 1990, he has held a Doctor of Science degree and became a corresponding member of the Hungarian Academy of Sciences. He was elected to full membership in 1995. In 2006, he received the highest state prize for scientific work, the Széchenyi Prize, and two years later he became an Honorary Citizen of Budapest. Beyond that, he was elected to the American Academy of Arts and Sciences in 2000.

He is the father of three children: his elder daughter, Szonja Szelényi (now Ivester), teaches sociology at University of California, Berkeley, his younger daughter Lilla Szelényi is on the State of California Workers’ Compensation Appeals Board (WCAB) in Oakland, California and his son Balázs teaches history at Northeastern University.

Works 

At the beginning of his scientific work, his research focused on urban communities. He wrote numerous publications on that issue, mostly in Hungarian. His critical stance on partyline issues was published in his book The Intellectuals on the Road to Class Power, which was published in English in 1979. It was also translated into German, French, Spanish and Japanese.

After he was forced to leave Hungary, his research profile changed. He studied the inequality in urban communities and about the structural problems of the capitalistic and socialistic society. His most important publications of these are Urban Inequalities under State Socialism (1983), Socialist Entrepreneurs. Embourgeoisement in Rural Hungary (1988), Social Conflicts of Post-communist Transitions (1992) and Making Capitalism without Capitalists (1998).

Some of his works were collected and published in 1990 and 2009.

Bibliography

Books in English
 Szelényi, Iván and Mihályi, Péter. (Nov 28, 2019). Varieties of Post-communist Capitalism. Leiden: Brill Publishers.

References

External links 
John C. Campbell's review of The Intellectuals on the Road to Class Power in 1979
Data page at the HAS

1938 births
Living people
Hungarian sociologists
Members of the Hungarian Academy of Sciences
Yale University faculty
Fellows of the American Academy of Arts and Sciences
Hungarian emigrants to the United States
Academic staff of New York University Abu Dhabi
Corvinus University of Budapest alumni